Profesionalen futbolen klub Svetkavitsa 1922 is a Bulgarian football club based in Targovishte, which currently competes in Bulgaria's third tier, the North-East Third League. They play their home matches at the local Dimitar Burkov Stadium.

Svetkavitsa have competed in the second division for a record 49 seasons, playing more second-flight league games than any other Bulgarian team.

Svetkavitsa played in the top tier for the first time during season  2011-12. They were relegated after winning just one of their 30 games. In 2013, the club was dissolved due to financial problems, but it was refounded the same year. Since then, the club has been mostly competing in the third tier.

The name of the club, Svetkavitsa, means lightning in Bulgarian, which is reflected on the club emblem.

History

Svetkavitsa was founded on 6 July 1922 from a merger of Levski and Botev, two neighborhood teams in Targovishte and has played in its current home ground, Dimitar Burkov Stadium, since 1971. In the 1961–62 season, the club was promoted for the first time to the B PFG. Svetkavitsa's most notable achievement in the twentieth century came in 1974, when they finished runners-up in the second division. In 1987, the club's form dropped, and they were relegated to V AFG, after finishing last. Svetkavitsa regained second-flight status in 1989 after a two-year absence.

Svetkavitsa established itself as a consistent team in the B Group during the early 2000s. The team finished the 2010—11 season in fourth place in the B PFG, their highest finish in the league since 1973–74, and claimed a spot in the play-offs for promotion to A PFG. Their qualification for the playoffs came after some controversy, however. Originally, second-placed Pomorie qualified for the playoffs, but Pomorie was not given a license for the A Group, despite winning the playoff. On the other hand, third-placed Spartak Plovdiv was relegated to the third tier for financial problems, thus allowing Svetkavitsa to enter the playoffs. Svetkavitsa defeated Etar Veliko Tarnovo 3–1 on 17 June 2011, to earn promotion to the A PFG. This achievement meant Svetkavitsa made its debut appearance in the top league since the 1948 founding of the competition.

Svetkavitsa entered the A Group as clear outsiders and favorites for relegation, mainly because of the team’s inexperience with top flight football, as well as the fact that Svetkavitsa wasn’t supposed to play in the playoffs for the A Group in the first place. Expectations proved to be reality, as the team’s first top-flight season ended poorly, with Svetkavitsa managing only one win, five draws, and 24 losses, marking one of the poorest performances for a team in the top tier. Their only win came against FC Kaliakra Kavarna. Svetkavitsa finished last and was relegated to the B Group.

The following season, the team finished in fourth place in the B Group, four points behind second-placed FC Lyubimets, who qualified for promotion. Before the 2013-14 season, the team decided to cancel their participation in the second league, for financial reasons. After the financial problems worsened, the team was dissolved in 2013, but refounded in 2014 starting from First Regional. The team promoted to the third league after one year, and has been playing there ever since.

Current squad

Statistics and Records 
The club's record appearance maker is Boris Stoyanov, who made 544 appearances between his debut in 1962 and retirement in 1980, and the club's record goalscorer is Dimo Valev, who scored 105 goals in 289 games between 1959 and 1973.

Competitive matches only. As of 14 May 2013.

Managers 
 Plamen Donev (1996–2011)
 Nikola Spasov (2011)
 Alyosha Andonov (2011–2012)
 Georgi Ivanov - Gesha (2012–2013)
 Miroslav Mironov (2013)

Past seasons

References

External links
bgclubs.eu

Football clubs in Bulgaria
Association football clubs established in 2013
2013 establishments in Bulgaria